Farleigh Wallop is a small village and civil parish in Hampshire, England, approximately  south of Basingstoke on the slopes of Farleigh Hill (208 m).

Since 1486, Farleigh Wallop has been the home of the Wallop family, including John Wallop, Henry Wallop, and Gerard Wallop, 9th Earl of Portsmouth, whose seat, Farleigh House, is in the village.

References

External links

 "Parishes: Farleigh Wallop", A History of the County of Hampshire: Volume 3 (1908), pp. 364-366, British History Online
 Hampshire County Council page

Civil parishes in Basingstoke and Deane
Villages in Hampshire